Fujiwara no Asamitsu (藤原 朝光; 951–995) was a prominent Japanese nobleman and waka poet of the Heian period. He was a member of the Fujiwara clan, which held significant political influence during this era.

Life 
Fujiwara no Asamitsu was born in Tenryaku 5 (951 in the Gregorian calendar). He was a son of the kanpaku and dajō-daijin Kanemichi, a member of the Northern Branch of the Fujiwara clan.

Asamitsu's name, 朝光, is glossed by Sonpi Bunmyaku as アサテル (Asateru), but in her article on him for the Nihon Koten Bungaku Daijiten Yukiko Hirano states that あさみつ (Asamitsu), given in the Takamitsu-shū (高光集, the personal anthology of Fujiwara no Takamitsu) and the Koōgimi-shū (小大君集, the personal anthology of Koōgimi), is the more correct reading.

He was 45 (by Japanese reckoning).

In addition to his poetry, Asamitsu held a high position in the imperial court and served as an important advisor to the Emperor. His political influence allowed him to promote and support other poets and writers of the Heian period.

Poetry 

Asamitsu's poetry was characterized by its elegance, simplicity, and depth of emotion. His works often explored the beauty of nature and the fleeting nature of human existence. 

Asamitsu excelled in poems on the daily life of the noble class into which he was born, such as romantic exchanges.

He hosted uta-awase contests in his residence, but did not himself compete. The Horikawa Chūnagon-ke Uta-awase in Ten'en 3 (975) was organized by him.

27 of his poems were included in imperial anthologies from the Shūishū on. He left a personal collection, the Asamitsu-shū.

Asamitsu's legacy as a poet and nobleman continues to be celebrated in Japan today. Many of his works have been included in anthologies of Japanese poetry and continue to be studied and appreciated for their beauty and insight into the culture and values of the Heian period.

Notes

References

Citations

Works cited 

 
 
 

Waka poets
10th-century Japanese poets
Kuge
951 births
995 deaths